At least fourteen ships of the French Navy have been named Lion:

Ships named Lion 

 , a 36-gun ship of the line, bore the name during her career
 , a 42-gun ship of the line, bore the name during her career
 , a 40-gun ship of the line, bore the name during her career
  (1694), a fireship
 , a 64-gun ship of the line, lead ship of her class
 , a  74-gun ship of the line renamed Marat before launch
  (1794), a corvette
 , a  74-gun ship of the line, bore the name during her career
 , a Téméraire-class ship of the line launched in 1804 and scuttled and burnt in 1809

  (1885), an 
  (1916), an armed trawler, ex-Brazilian Ernestina
 , an armed boat
 , a  launched in 1929 and scuttled in 1942.
 , a

Other ships with similar names 
 , a 27-gun fluyt, ex-Briton Lion captured from the British
 , a 28-gun ship of the line
 , a 22-gun ship of the line
 , a 46-gun ship of the line, bore the name Lion de Smaland during her career
 , a 24-gun ship of the line, also originally named Lion rouge
 , a fireship, bore the name Lion d'Or during her career
 , a 40-gun ship of the line, possibly the captured Turkish ship Al Assad el Ahmar.
 , an armed ketch
 , an armed trawler

Ships named Lionne are at French ship Lionne.

Notes and references

References

Bibliography
 
 

French Navy ship names